Four Lives, originally and internationally titled The Barking Murders, is a British television serial, first aired from 3 to 5 January 2022 on BBC One. It follows the true story of the families of four young gay men (Anthony Walgate, Gabriel Kovari, Daniel Whitworth and Jack Taylor) who in 2014 and 2015 were murdered by Stephen Port. Facing failings by the Metropolitan Police, they fought for justice for their loved ones. Stephen Merchant plays serial killer Port with Sheridan Smith as Sarah Sak, the mother of Anthony Walgate, Port's first victim.

Production
First announced in early 2020, production on the show was halted due to the COVID-19 pandemic. The series was delayed twice after its announcement. On 13 December 2021 the official trailer was released with stills from the show being released on social media. During promotion for the series, star Sheridan Smith shared: "Every night I was going home in bits, crying – you can't help but take it home [...] I really beat myself up with it because I want to do a good job for them."

Cast

 Stephen Merchant as Stephen Port
 Sheridan Smith as Sarah Sak
 Tim Preston as Anthony Walgate
 Jakub Svec as Gabriel Kovari
 Leo Flanagan as Daniel Whitworth
 Samuel Barnett as Ryan Edwards
 Paddy Rowan as Jack Taylor
 Robert Emms as Ricky
 Michael Jibson as DC Slaymaker
 Kris Hitchen as Tom
 Memet Ali Alabora as Sami Sak
 Daniel Ryan as Adam Whitworth
 Rufus Jones as John Pape
 Ian Puleston-Davies as Karl Turner MP
 Giselle Cullinane as Barbara Denham
 Ben Cartwright as Det. Sgt. O'Donnell
 Leanne Best as Kate
 Isabella Laughland as China
 Alexa Davies as Kiera
 Shaun Thomas as Paul
 Jack Pierce as Acting DI Rolf Schamberger
 Ella Kenion as Mandy Pearson
 Jaime Winstone as Donna Taylor
 Stephanie Hyam as Jenny Taylor
 Holly Aird as Jeanette Taylor
 Tom Christian as DC Ian Atkinson
 Jason Done as a Barking Police Sergeant
 Mollie Winnard as Demi

Episodes

Release 
Four Lives first aired from 3 to 5 January 2022 on BBC One.

It aired on SBS Television in Australia over three weeks from 14 April 2022.

Four Lives is distributed internationally by BritBox as The Barking Murders.

Reception
Writing in The Independent, Ed Cumming said, "In less sensitive hands, a case like this could lend itself to prurience or melodrama, but Neil Mackay's script and David Blair's direction deftly avoid these traps".

In The Guardian, Lucy Mangan said, "The drama does a good job of making the victims... live again... Beyond that, and despite the usual great work of Sheridan Smith and others, the drama never catches fire".

Hugo Rifkind in The Times wrote, "Superficially, the most interesting thing about Four Lives was the casting of the great Stephen Merchant as Port. There's something intrinsically chilling about a comedian as a killer, but Merchant was more blank than sinister. This didn't particularly matter because although Port inevitably sat at the heart of Four Lives, this was more a story about police incompetence...".

References

External links
 

2022 British television series debuts
2022 British television series endings
2020s British LGBT-related drama television series
2020s British television miniseries
BBC television dramas
BBC television miniseries
English-language television shows
Gay-related television shows
Television series about serial killers
Television series by ITV Studios
Television series set in 2014
Television series set in 2015
Television series set in 2016
Television shows set in London